Clarence John "Clancy" Brown III (born January 5, 1959) is an American actor. Prolific in film and television since the 1980s, Brown is often cast in villainous and authoritative roles.

His film roles include Viking Lofgren in Bad Boys (1983), Rawhide in The Adventures of Buckaroo Banzai Across the 8th Dimension (1984), The Kurgan in Highlander (1986), Sheriff Gus Gilbert in Pet Sematary Two (1992), Capt. Byron Hadley in The Shawshank Redemption (1994), Sgt. Charles Zim in Starship Troopers (1997), and Stanley Thomas in Promising Young Woman (2020). On television, he has played Brother Justin Crowe on the HBO series Carnivàle (2003–2005), Waylon "Jock" Jeffcoat on the Showtime series Billions (2018–2019), and Kurt Caldwell on the Showtime series Dexter: New Blood (2021–2022).

Brown is a prolific voice actor, who is best known as the voice of Lex Luthor in the DC Animated Universe (1996–2006) as well as other DC Comics projects, and Mr. Krabs on SpongeBob SquarePants (1999–present). Other characters he has voiced include Doctor Neo Cortex and Uka Uka in the Crash Bandicoot franchise (1997–2003), Savage Opress in Star Wars: The Clone Wars (2011–2013), Surtur in Thor: Ragnarok (2017), and Hank Anderson in Detroit: Become Human (2018).

Early life
Clancy Brown was born on January 5, 1959, in Urbana, Ohio, and had an older sister, Beth who died in 1964. Their mother, Joyce Helen (Eldridge), was a conductor, composer and concert pianist. His father, Clarence J. "Bud" Brown Jr. (1927–2022), was a newspaper publisher who helped manage the Brown Publishing Company, the family-owned newspaper business started by Clancy's grandfather, Congressman Clarence J. Brown. From 1965 to 1983, Bud Brown also served as a congressman, in the same seat as his own father, and later as Chairman of the Board of Brown Publishing. The family continued to operate the business until 2010.

Brown graduated from St. Albans School in Washington, D.C., and Northwestern University. At St. Albans, Brown performed the role of Deputy Governor Thomas Danforth in The Crucible. Brown has been married to Jeanne Johnson since 1993. They have a son and a daughter.
Brown is a member of the Sigma Chi Fraternity.

Career

Live-action performances

In Brown's first mainstream movie, he was cast as Viking Lofgren alongside Sean Penn in the 1983 crime drama Bad Boys. Brown is known for his role as the Kurgan in the 1986 film Highlander, his role as Captain Byron Hadley in The Shawshank Redemption, Rawhide in The Adventures of Buckaroo Banzai Across the 8th Dimension (1984), Frankenstein's monster in The Bride (1985), Army mercenary Larry McRose in Extreme Prejudice, the role of a band manager in Thunder Alley (1985), vicious killer Steve in Shoot to Kill (1988), the police officer in Michael Jackson's short movie Speed Demon (1988), Dead Man Walking, Sheriff Gus Gilbert in Pet Sematary Two, Sergeant Zim in Starship Troopers (a role he would reprise in the animated series Roughnecks: Starship Troopers Chronicles), and Captain William Hadley in The Guardian. He also played a role in Flubber as one of the evil henchmen that get harmed by uncontrollably bouncing sports equipment. In 1989, he appeared in the action thriller Blue Steel.

Brown has played prison officers in three films dealing with miscarriages of justice: the tyrannical Captain Byron Hadley in The Shawshank Redemption, the sympathetic Lt. Williams in The Hurricane, and Lt. McMannis in Last Light. In 2001, he played a magical character credited as 'The granter of wishes' in the Hallmark version of Snow White. In 2007, he played the Viking leader opposite Karl Urban in Pathfinder.

He starred in several independent films in 2008: The Burrowers, screened at the Toronto International Film Festival in 2008, and released in the United States on DVD in April 2009, and The Twenty. He appeared in Steven Soderbergh's 2009 film The Informant! opposite Matt Damon in which he played an attorney. He also portrayed Alan Smith in Samuel Bayer's 2010 remake of the horror film A Nightmare on Elm Street. In 2011, he appeared in Cowboys & Aliens (directed by Jon Favreau) with Daniel Craig, Harrison Ford and Olivia Wilde. He was cast as the voice of The Goon in the animated feature film. He also starred as Albert Marconi in the film adaptation of the David Wong novel John Dies at the End, directed by Don Coscarelli.

Brown was a series regular on the science fiction series Earth 2 from 1994 to 1995, playing the role of John Danziger. Brown was notable as the sinister preacher Brother Justin Crowe in the HBO series Carnivàle. Though the series only ran for two seasons, Carnivàle has attained a cult popularity and his performance was applauded by critics for showcasing a new side to his acting talents. He also starred in the Showtime production In the Company of Spies and the HBO film Cast a Deadly Spell. As conservative United States Attorney General Jock Jeffcoat, he was one of the primary antagonists in seasons three and four of the Showtime series Billions.

He has also made many guest appearances on various television series including ER, the Star Trek: Enterprise episode "Desert Crossing" as Zobral, Lost as Kelvin Joe Inman, and former baseball player (and investment scam mark) Rudy Blue on The Riches. Brown also appeared as the frontiersman Simon Kenton, the key to America's westward expansion, in the 2000 Kentucky Educational Television production "A Walk with Simon Kenton". Kenton resembled Brown in stature and is buried in Brown's hometown. Brown most recently appeared as Hart Sterling, founding partner of fictional law firm Sterling, Huddle, Oppenheim & Craft in ABC's The Deep End. He also guest starred on the Leverage series episode "The Gone Fishin Job" and on The Dukes of Hazzard sixth-season episode "Too Many Roscos". Currently, he appears on The CW's TV production of The Flash in the recurring guest-star role of General Wade Eiling. He has also portrayed Ray Schoonover in the Daredevil episodes "Guilty as Sin" and "The Dark at the End of the Tunnel" and The Punisher episode "Kandahar". He played Sheriff Joe Corbin in Sleepy Hollow. In 2022, Brown joined the cast of The Boys spin-off series Gen V in an undisclosed role.

Voice-over work
As a voice-over actor, Brown has appeared in several video games, usually playing an antagonistic character. He lends his voice to several of the crystallized dragons in the PlayStation game Spyro the Dragon. He voiced the corrupt Baron Praxis in the PlayStation 2 video game Jak II; Doctor Neo Cortex and Uka Uka in a number of the Crash Bandicoot video games; Montross (a Mandalorian rival of Jango Fett) in Star Wars: Bounty Hunter; Hades in God of War III; Thrall in the cancelled video game Warcraft Adventures: Lord of the Clans; Scourgelord Tyrannus in World of Warcraft: Wrath of the Lich King; the conniving Alderman Richard Hughes in the Xbox 360 game Saints Row; and the cynical, foul-mouthed Lt. Anderson in Detroit: Become Human.

For animated television series, he voiced several characters (Hakon, Tomas Brod and Wolf) in the series Gargoyles; Tanuki Gonta in the English language dub of Pom Poko (1994); Raiden on the animated series Mortal Kombat: Defenders of the Realm; a Hessian trooper in The Night of the Headless Horseman (1999); billionaire Maxmilian Speil in Godzilla: The Series; and five of the six members of Legion Ex Machina in Big Guy and Rusty the Boy Robot.

Since 1999, he has played the role of Mr. Krabs of SpongeBob SquarePants (as well as The SpongeBob SquarePants Movie and its two sequels The SpongeBob Movie: Sponge Out of Water and The SpongeBob Movie: Sponge on the Run). From 2000 to 2005, he played several roles (Captain Black, Ratso and the animated moose doll Super Moose) on Jackie Chan Adventures. He also voiced Vice-Principal Pangborn in All Grown Up!, Barkmeat in Catscratch, Otto in Super Robot Monkey Team Hyperforce Go! (which also stars fellow SpongeBob co-star Tom Kenny, who voices Gibson) and Gorrath in Megas XLR.

For Disney, he has played roles such as the Dark Dragon in American Dragon: Jake Long, the Ugly Bald Guy in the movie Recess: School's Out, as well as Undertow in The Little Mermaid II: Return to the Sea, and he also made a guest appearance in the Kim Possible episode "Oh, No! Yono" where he played the titular character. He also lent his voice to King Frederick in the Disney Channel series Rapunzel's Tangled Adventure and the Disney Channel movie Tangled: Before Ever After.

For Nickelodeon, Brown has voiced several characters in the Avatar franchise, such as corrupt Dai Li leader Long Feng in Avatar: The Last Airbender in 2006 and top gangster Yakone in The Legend of Korra in 2012. He guest-starred in Dungeon as the Demon Cat and the narrator for the opening and closing quotes in the episode "Ocean of Fear". Brown also voices Destro in G.I. Joe: Renegades; Jeff Fischer's biological father in American Dad!; Grune the Destroyer in the ThunderCats reboot; and the recurring role of Agent Silas in Transformers: Prime.

From 2011 to 2013, Brown voiced Savage Opress, Count Dooku's new apprentice and Darth Maul's brother, in Star Wars: The Clone Wars. He starred as Chris "Dogpound or Rahzar" Bradford, Shredder's top henchman, in the 2012 Teenage Mutant Ninja Turtles television series. From the third quarter of 2014, Brown began doing voice-overs as the main talent for Chevy truck national and regional television commercials. On March 21, 2016, Brown began voicing a new character to the series, Red Death, a parody of the Marvel villain Red Skull, in The Venture Brothers episode "Red Means Stop". He continued this role in season 7, and was signed to appear in season 8 before the show's cancellation.

DC Universe
Brown is well known for voicing the villainous Lex Luthor in various animated media for over twelve years. He first voiced Luthor in the DCAU, starting with Superman: The Animated Series (where he had originally auditioned for the role of Superman) and reprised his role in the subsequent animated series Justice League and Justice League Unlimited. He also voiced the character in the video game Superman: Shadow of Apokolips as well as The Batman cartoon series. Brown later again played Luthor in the 2009 animated film Superman/Batman: Public Enemies. He also voiced a character under the name Rohtul (which is Luthor spelled backwards) in Batman: Brave and the Bold (while Kevin Michael Richardson provided the voice of the actual character). Brown once again voiced Lex in the video games Lego Batman 2: DC Super Heroes, Lego Batman 3: Beyond Gotham and Lego DC Super Villains. From all these vocal appearances, Brown has played Lex Luthor longer than any other actor in history, including his own Justice League co-star Michael Rosenbaum (in Smallville).

Brown is also known for his voice work as villains in various DC animated series, movies, television shows, and video games: Charlie "Big Time" Bigelow on Batman Beyond, Trident on the Teen Titans cartoon series, Mr. Freeze and Bane on The Batman cartoon series, Per Degaton in Batman: The Brave and the Bold, Parallax in the live-action Green Lantern film, King Faraday in the Young Justice cartoon series, and General Zartok in Green Lantern: The Animated Series. He appeared on The CW's The Flash recurring in the first season as General Wade Eiling.

Marvel Universe
Brown has also voiced various Marvel characters in various animated projects: Sasquatch on The Incredible Hulk 1996 cartoon series, several characters (George Stacy, Rhino and Ox) on The Spectacular Spider-Man, Mr. Sinister on Wolverine and the X-Men, Odin in Avengers: Earth's Mightiest Heroes, and both Red Hulk and Taskmaster on Hulk and the Agents of S.M.A.S.H. and the Ultimate Spider-Man cartoon series. In Daredevil and The Punisher he plays Major Schoonover, Frank Castle's former commanding officer. In Thor: Ragnarok, he voices the fire demon Surtur.

Filmography

Live-action

Film

Television

Voice roles

Film

Television

Video games

Theme parks

References

Further reading

External links

 
 
 
 

1959 births
Living people
20th-century American male actors
21st-century American male actors
American male film actors
American male television actors
American male video game actors
American male voice actors
American people of Dutch descent
American people of English descent
American people of French-Canadian descent
American people of German descent
American people of Irish descent
American people of Scottish descent
American people of Swiss descent
American people of Welsh descent
Clancy
Male actors from Ohio
Northwestern University School of Communication alumni
People from Urbana, Ohio
St. Albans School (Washington, D.C.) alumni